Yves Caron (born 27 September 1937) was a Liberal party member of the House of Commons of Canada. He was an accounting clerk, alcohol distributor and salesperson by career.

Born in Saint-Georges, Quebec, Caron was first elected at the Beauce riding in the 1972 general election. He was re-elected in the 1974 federal election but was defeated in the 1979 election by Fabien Roy of the Social Credit party. He served in the 29th and 30th Parliaments.

After leaving the House of Commons, Caron was an interim War Veterans Allowances Board member. He also received two consecutive ten-year appointments to the Canadian Pension Commission in 1984.

References

External links
 

1937 births
Liberal Party of Canada MPs
Living people
Members of the House of Commons of Canada from Quebec
People from Saint-Georges, Quebec